is a special ward in Tokyo, Japan. The Ward refers to itself as Shinagawa City in English. The Ward is home to ten embassies.

, the Ward had an estimated population of 380,293 and a population density of 16,510 persons per km2. The total area is 22.84 km2.

Shinagawa is also commonly used to refer to the business district around Shinagawa Station, which is not in Shinagawa Ward. This Shinagawa is in the Takanawa and Konan neighborhoods of Minato Ward, directly north of Kita-Shinagawa.

Geography
Shinagawa Ward includes natural uplands and lowlands, as well as reclaimed land. The uplands are the eastern end of the Musashino Terrace. They include Shiba-Shirokanedai north of the Meguro River, Megurodai between the Meguro and Tachiai Rivers, and Ebaradai south of the Tachiai River.

The Ward lies on Tokyo Bay. Its neighbors on land are all special wards of Tokyo: Kōtō to the east, Minato to the north, Meguro to the west, and Ōta to the south.

Districts and neighborhoods
Shinagawa Ward consists of five areas, each consisting of multiple districts and neighborhoods:

Shinagawa District, including the former Shinagawa-juku on the Tōkaidō.
 District, formerly a town of that name, stretching from Ōsaki Station to Gotanda and Meguro Stations.
 District, formerly a town of that name.
 District, formerly a town of that name.
 District, consisting of reclaimed land, including Higashiyashio on Odaiba.

Shinagawa Area
 Higashishinagawa
 Hiromachi
 Kitashinagawa
 Minamishinagawa
 Nishishinagawa
Oi Area
 Oi
 Higashioi
 Katsushima
 Minamioi
 Nishioi
Osaki Area
 Ōsaki
 Higashigotanda
 Kamiōsaki
 Nishigotanda

Ebara Area
 Ebara
 Futaba
 Hatanodai
 Higashinakanobu
 Hiratsuka
 Koyama
 Koyamadai
 Nakanobu
 Nishinakanobu
 Togoshi
 Yutakacho
Yashio Area
 Yashio
 Higashiyashio

History

Most of Tokyo east of the Imperial Palace is on reclaimed land. A large proportion of the reclamation took place during the Edo period, when Shinagawa-juku was the first shukuba (post town) in the "53 Stations of the Tōkaidō" that a traveler would reach after setting out from Nihonbashi to Kyoto on the Tōkaidō. The Tokugawa shogunate maintained the Suzugamori execution grounds in Shinagawa.

Following the Meiji Restoration and the abolition of the han system, Shinagawa Prefecture was instituted in 1869. The prefectural administration was to be set up in the Ebara District, but in 1871 Shinagawa Prefecture was integrated into Tokyo Prefecture. In 1932, during the reorganisation of the municipal boundaries of Tokyo City following the 1923 Great Kantō earthquake, a smaller version of Shinagawa Ward was created. On March 15, 1947, this was merged with the neighboring Ebara Ward to create the present Shinagawa Ward.

The Ward's historic post-town function is retained today with several large hotels near the train station offering 6,000 rooms, the largest concentration in Tokyo.

The Tōkaidō Shinkansen high-speed rail line began serving Shinagawa Station in 2003.

Politics and government
Shinagawa is run by an assembly of 40 elected members.

Embassies in Shinagawa

 Belarus
 Brunei
 Colombia
 Indonesia
 Mauritania
 Myanmar
 North Macedonia
 Thailand
 Zambia

Economy

Corporate headquarters

Many companies are headquartered in Shinagawa Ward. Isuzu, a diesel engine and commercial truck manufacturer; JTB Corporation, a major travel agency; Nippon Light Metal, an aluminum and chemical products company; MOS Burger (in the ThinkPark Tower, Ōsaki); Lawson (East Tower of Gate City Ohsaki in Ōsaki), Namco Bandai Holdings; Namco Bandai Games; Banpresto; Rakuten, Honda brand Acura; Toyo Seikan, a packaging manufacturer; NSK Ltd., a bearing maker; Fuji Electric, an electrical equipment manufacturer;  Imagica, a media post-production company;  Nippon Chemi-Con, an electronic components manufacturer;  Topy Industries, a machinery and automotive components company; Gakken, a publishing and educational services company; Comsys, a telecommunications construction and engineering company; and Pola Cosmetics all have their headquarters within Shinagawa Ward. Marza Animation Planet also has its headquarters in Shinagawa on the 18th floor of the NYK Tennoz Building near Tennōzu Isle Station. And recently, since August 2018, Sega Sammy, best known for its Sonic the Hedgehog franchise and also the owner of both the Nakano-based TMS Entertainment and (through TMS Entertainment) the aforementioned Marza Animation Planet, has its headquarters in Shinagawa at the Sumitomo Fudosan Osaki Garden Tower near Ōsaki Station.

Japan Airlines (JAL), the head office of its subsidiary JAL Hotels, and registered offices of JAL Express and JALways are located in the Tennōzu Isle area. In addition, Jalux, a subsidiary, has its head office in the I·S Building. One group of employees moved into the building on July 26, 2010, and one on August 2, 2010.

On 8 July 2022, Nikon announced they have begun construction on a new headquarters adjacent to their Oi Plan.   The Nikon HQ is supposed to be completed in 2024 and its address is: , Nishioi 1-chome, Shinagawa-ku, Tokyo

Other offices
Other companies maintain branch offices or research facilities in Shinagawa Ward. Sony operates the Gotenyama Technology Center and the Osaki East Technology Center in Shinagawa. Sony used to have its headquarters in Shinagawa. Sony moved to Minato, Tokyo around the end of 2006 and closed the Osaki West Technology Center in Shinagawa around 2007. Adobe Systems maintains its Japan headquarters on the 19th Floor of Gate City Ohsaki near Ōsaki Station, while Siemens AG has its Japan offices in Takanawa Park Tower. Phoenix Technologies operates its Japan office on the 8th floor of the Gotanda NN Building in Gotanda. Siemens Japan and Philips also have offices in Shinagawa.
Microsoft and ExxonMobil have their Japanese headquarters in Konan, Minato, near Shinagawa. Kojima Productions offices are also located in Shinagawa.

Former economic operations
A JAL subsidiary, Japan Asia Airways, was also headquartered in the JAL Building until JAL dissolved it.
GEOS, an English language school company, once had its headquarters in Shinagawa. At one time Air Nippon had its headquarters in Shinagawa.

Places

Museums
O Art Museum

The Museum of Maritime Science
Sugino Costume Museum

Ohi Racecourse
Site of Suzugamori execution grounds
Site of Hamakawa Gun Battery
 Shopping District
 Shopping District "PALM" 
Parks

Rinshi-no-mori Park

 – site of a daimyō's villa
 – site of a daimyō's villa
 (Seven Lucky Gods in Ebara area)
Buddhist temples

Tōkai-ji

Shintō shrines

Kashima Shrine
Churches
Meguro Catholic Church (St. Anselm's Church)
St. Stephen's Church, Tokyo St. Mary's Church – Anglican churches
Christ Shinagawa Church – Presbyterian church
Shinagawa Baptist Church, Oi Baptist Church

Education

Higher education
Hoshi University
Rissho University
Seisen University
Showa University
Tokyo Health Care University
Sugino Fashion College 
Advanced Institute of Industrial Technology – graduate school
 – college of technology (kōsen)

Primary and secondary education
Public elementary and junior high schools are operated by the Shinagawa Ward Board of Education. Public high schools are operated by the Tokyo Metropolitan Government Board of Education.

Metropolitan high schools

Private high schools
 affiliated to the Bunkyo University

 (plans to become coeducational in 2023, with the new name Shinagawa Gakugei High School (品川学藝高等学校))
St. Hilda's School

, formerly Ono Gakuen Girls' Junior High and Senior High School (小野学園女子中学・高等学校)

International schools
Canadian International School in Tokyo
KAIS International School
Special education schools
Tokyo Metropolitan Shinagawa Special Needs Education School – public school for intellectually disabled children
 – private deaf school

Municipal combined elementary and junior high schools:
 Ebara Hiratsuka Gakuen (荏原平塚学園)
 Hino Gakuen (日野学園)
 Houyou no Mori Gakuen (豊葉の杜学園)
 Ito Gakuen (伊藤学園)
 Shinagawa Gakuen (品川学園)
 Yashio Gakuen (八潮学園)

Municipal junior high schools:
 Ebara No. 1 Junior High School (荏原第一中学校)
 Ebara No. 5 Junior High School (荏原第五中学校)
 Ebara No. 6 Junior High School (荏原第六中学校)
 Fujimidai Junior High School (冨士見台中学校)
 Hamakawa Junior High School (浜川中学校)
 Osaki Junior High School (大崎中学校)
 Suzugamori Junior High School (鈴ヶ森中学校)
 Togoshidai Junior High School (戸越台中学校)
 Tokai Junior High School (東海中学校)

Municipal elementary schools:
 No. 2 Enzan Elementary School (第二延山小学校)
 No. 1 Hino Elementary School (第一日野小学校)
 No. 3 Hino Elementary School (第三日野小学校)
 No. 4 Hino Elementary School (第四日野小学校)
 Asamadai Elementary School (浅間台小学校)
 Daiba Elementary School (台場小学校)
 Enzan Elementary School (延山小学校)
 Genjimae Elementary School (源氏前小学校)
 Gotenyama Elementary School (御殿山小学校)
 Hamakawa Elementary School (浜川小学校)
 Hatanodai Elementary School (旗台小学校)
 Hosui Elementary School (芳水小学校)
 Ito Elementary School (伊藤小学校)
 Jonan Elementary School (城南小学校)
 Jonan No. 2 Elementary School (城南第二小学校)
 Kamishinmei Elementary School (上神明小学校)
 Keiyo Elementary School (京陽小学校)
 Koyama Elementary School (小山小学校)
 Koyamadai Elementary School (小山台小学校)
 Mitsugi Elementary School (三木小学校)
 Miyamae Elementary School (宮前小学校)
 Nakanobu Elementary School (中延小学校)
 Ohara Elementary School (大原小学校)
 Oi No. 1 Elementary School (大井第一小学校)
 Samehama Elementary School (鮫浜小学校)
 Shimizudai Elementary School (清水台小学校)
 Suzugamori Elementary School (鈴ヶ森小学校)
 Tachiai Elementary School (立会小学校)
 Togoshi Elementary School (戸越小学校)
 Ushiroji Elementary School (後地小学校)
 Yamanaka Elementary School (山中小学校)

Transport

Important railway stations

Gotanda Station
Meguro Station
Ōsaki Station
Ōimachi Station

Shinagawa Station is in fact located in neighboring Minato but also serves the northern part of Shinagawa, and is a stop on the high-speed Tōkaidō Shinkansen line.

Rail
East Japan Railway Company (JR East)
Yamanote Line: Ōsaki, Gotanda and Meguro Stations
Keihin-Tōhoku Line: Ōimachi Station
Saikyō Line: Ōsaki Station
Tōkaidō Main Line: does not stop at the stations in Shinagawa
Yokosuka Line: Nishi-Ōi Station
Shōnan-Shinjuku Line: Ōsaki and Nishi-Ōi Stations
Tokyu Corporation (Tōkyū)
Tōkyū Meguro Line: Meguro, Fudō-mae, Musashi-Koyama and Nishi-Koyama Stations
Tōkyū Ōimachi Line: Shimo-Shinmei and Togoshi-kōen, Nakanobu, Ebaramachi and Hatanodai Stations
Tōkyū Ikegami Line: Gotanda, Ōsaki-Hirokōji, Togoshi-Ginza, Ebara-Nakanobu and Hatanodai Stations
Tokyo Waterfront Area Rapid Transit (Rinkai Line): Tennōzu Isle, Shinagawa Seaside, Ōimachi and Ōsaki Stations
Tokyo Monorail: Tennōzu Isle and Ōi Keibajō Mae Stations
Keikyu Corporation (Keikyū)
Keikyū Main Line: Kitashinagawa, Shimbamba, Aomono-yokochō, Samezu, Tachiaigawa and Ōmorikaigan Stations
Tokyo Metro
Namboku Line: Meguro Station
Tokyo Metropolitan Bureau of Transportation (Toei)
Mita Line: Meguro Station
Asakusa Line: Gotanda, Togoshi and Nakanobu Stations

Road
Shuto Expressway (Shutokō)
Route 1 "Haneda Sen"
Route 2 "Meguro Sen"
Bayshore Route "Wangan Sen"
Central Circular Route "Chūō Kanjō Sen"
National highways
Route 1 "Sakurada Dōri", "Dai-Ni Keihin"
Route 15 "Dai-Ichi Keihin"
Route 357 "Tokyo Wangan Dōro"

Shinagawa is also home to the main motor vehicle registration facility for central Tokyo (located east of Samezu Station). As a result, many license plates in Tokyo are labeled with the name "Shinagawa."

Major incidents / accidents 
 1863 – British Liberines burning case
 1964 – Shinagawa Katsushima warehouse explosion fire
 1987 – Explosion accident at the Oi thermal power plant
 1995 – Death case of arrest and detention of public affairs notary public office

Sister cities
Shinagawa has sister-city relationships with Auckland in New Zealand, Geneva in Switzerland, and Portland, Maine, in the United States.
 Geneva, Switzerland
 Auckland, New Zealand
 Portland, Maine

Others 
Shinagawa has an  relationship with Harbin in China, and has concluded "hometown exchange agreements" with Hayakawa in Yamanashi Prefecture and Yamakita in Kanagawa Prefecture.
 Harbin, China 
 Hayakawa, Yamanashi, Japan
 Yamakita, Kanagawa, Japan

Notable people from Shinagawa
 Tadasuke Akiyama, Japanese photographer
 Shizuka Arakawa, Japanese figure skater
 Nobutoshi Canna (Real Name: Nobutoshi Hayashi, Nihongo: 林 延年, Hayashi Nobutoshi), Japanese actor, voice actor, singer and narrator
 Char (Real Name: Hisato Takenaka, Nihongo: 竹中 尚人, Takenaka Hisato), Japanese musician, singer-songwriter and record producer
 Osamu Dezaki, Japanese anime director and screenwriter
 Renji Ishibashi (Real Name: Renji Ishida, Nihongo: 石田 蓮司, Ishida Renji), Japanese actor
 Kenji Kawai, Japanese composer and arranger
 Momoko Kikuchi, Japanese actress, entertainer, singer, and scholar 
 Yun Kōga (Real Name: Risa Kimura, Nihongo: 木村 理沙, Kimura Risa), Japanese manga artist
 Akira Kurosawa, Japanese film director, screenwriter, and producer
 Taiki Matsuno (Real Name: Tatsuya Matsuno, Nihongo: 松野 達也, Matsuno Tatsuya), Japanese actor and voice actor
 Takeshi Mori, December 2, 1959, in Shinagawa, Tokyo, Japan), Japanese television announcer and tarento
 Keiji Nishikawa, Japanese professional shogi player ranked 8-dan
 Riho (Real Name Unknown), Japanese professional wrestler and idol
 Yuki Sato, Japanese actor
 Chiyoko Shimakura, enka singer and TV presenter
 Tetsuo Suda, Japanese TV presenter and news anchor
 Issei Tamura, Japanese mixed martial artist
 Taeko Watanabe, Japanese manga artist
 Miki Yamada, Japanese politician, member of the House of Representatives and member of the Liberal Democratic Party
 Masamoto Yashiro, Japanese businessman
 Masayoshi Takanaka (高中 正義, Takanaka Masayoshi), Japanese guitarist, composer, and producer.

Gallery

References

External links

Shinagawa City Official Website 

 
Wards of Tokyo